Geocell is a mobile communication brand owned by Silknet. Geocell is the first GSM operator entered Georgian market.

Geocell was founded as an independent company in 1996 with a shared Georgian and Turkish investment. Control of the company was held by the Georgian side. The company's 900 MHz GSM network became fully operational in March 1997.

On 27 March 2001 Geocell acquired Georgia's third largest GSM provider "GT Mobile", renamed it into its second branch "Lai-Lai", and started operating on the 1800 MHz frequency.

Alongside standard GSM and GPRS services the company owns a UMTS license (2100 MHz), enabling 3G technologies including HSDPA.

From 2007 until 2018 Geocell was part of the TeliaSonera Group. Since 2018 it has been a part of Silknet.

Geocell coverage area occupies more than 98% of the country territory. Geocell subscribers are able to use roaming service in 150 countries worldwide.

Nowadays number of registered Geocell subscribers is around 2 million people.

Logo history

1996–2009

2009–2018

2018–2020

2020–present

See also
Silknet
MagtiCom
Beeline
List of companies of Georgia

References

External links
 

Telecommunications companies of Georgia (country)
Companies based in Tbilisi
Telecommunications companies established in 1996
1996 establishments in Georgia (country)
Brands of Georgia (country)
2018 mergers and acquisitions